This is a list of mayors of Oakville, Ontario.

References

Oakville, Ontario